The Campeonato Amapaense, commonly known simply as Amapazão, is the football league of the State of Amapá, Brazil. It is organized by the Amapá State Football Federation.

Format

First Stage
Standard round-robin, in which all teams play each other once.
Single leg playoff between the top 2 teams. The winner of this playoff qualifies for the championship final.

Second Stage
Standard round-robin, in which all teams play each other once.
Single leg playoff between the top 2 teams. The winner of this playoff qualifies for the championship final.

Third stage (if necessary)
Home-and-away playoff with the winners of the first and second stages.

If a team wins both stages (first and second) it is crowned the champion. If not, the third stage is disputed, and the winner is crowned the champion.

The two teams last placed overall are relegated.

As in any other Brazilian soccer championship, the format can change every year.

Clubs
2022 edition

Others clubs
Clube Atlético Aliança
Amapá Clube
Cristal Atlético Clube
Mazagão Atlético Clube
Sociedade Esportiva e Recreativa São José
Ypiranga Clube

List of champions

Amateur era

Names change

Professional era

Titles by team
Teams in bold stills active.

By city

References

External links
RSSSF Brasil

 
Amapaense